The orangefin shiner (Notropis ammophilus) is a species of ray-finned fish in the genus Notropis. It is widely distributed in the Mobile basin, below the Fall Line in Alabama and Mississippi, with disjunct populations occur in the Yellow Creek system of the Tennessee River drainage in northern Mississippi, in the headwaters of the Hatchie River system in northern Mississippi and southwestern Tennessee, and in the Skuna River system of the Yazoo drainage in northern Mississippi.

References 

 Robert Jay Goldstein, Rodney W. Harper, Richard Edwards: American Aquarium Fishes. Texas A&M University Press 2000, p. 87
 

Notropis
Fish described in 1990